Carlo Salvemini (born 4 June 1966) is an Italian politician, Mayor of Lecce from June 2017 to January 2019 and again since May 2019.

Biography 
He was born in Lecce, Apulia and is the son of the former mayor of Lecce Stefano Salvemini. He graduated in Economics and Commerce from the University of Bari in 1991 and obtained the qualification for the pursuit of doctoral student in 1992. In February 2017 he was accepted to become the candidate for mayor of Lecce after a public petition and a period of debates between the Democratic Party and the entire left-center Salento. Salvemini was elected Mayor of Lecce on 30 June 2017. He resigned in January 2019 and was re-elected at the 2019 local elections in June.

See also
 2017 Italian local elections
 2019 Italian local elections
 List of mayors of Lecce

References

External links 
 Official website

Living people
1966 births
People from Lecce
Democratic Party (Italy) politicians
21st-century Italian politicians
Mayors of Lecce